The 2000 European Nations Cup (ENC) Third Division (a European rugby union competition for national teams) was contested by five countries over one year during which all teams meet each other one time. The winner was Czech Republic and the runners-up was Poland, both were promoted to Division 2.

Tunisia, played as host, out of ranking.

Table

Results

See also
 European Nations Cup First Division 2000
 European Nations Cup Second Division 2000
 European Nations Cup Fourth Division 2000

1999–2000
1999–2000 in European rugby union